The 2021–22 WHL season was the 56th season of the Western Hockey League (WHL). The league played a full 68-game regular season having begun on October 1 and ended on April 17. 

The WHL announced that no interconference games would be played during the regular season. On August 16, the WHL announced a mandatory COVID-19 vaccination policy for all players, hockey operations staff, officials, and all other employees who regularly interact with players. On September 8, the WHL announced that due to COVID-19 border restrictions, the schedule had been re-aligned so that the B.C. Division and U.S. Division would not play interdivision games until at least November.

The playoffs began on April 22 and ended on June 13. The Edmonton Oil Kings were awarded the Ed Chynoweth Cup and participated in the 2022 Memorial Cup which was hosted by the Saint John Sea Dogs of the Quebec Major Junior Hockey League at TD Station in Saint John, New Brunswick.

Standings

Conference standings 

x – team has clinched playoff spot

y – team has clinched division

z – team has clinched conference title

e – team is eliminated from playoff contention

Statistical leaders

Scoring leaders 
Players are listed by points, then goals.

Note: GP = Games played; G = Goals; A = Assists; Pts. = Points; PIM = Penalty minutes

Goaltenders 
These are the goaltenders that lead the league in GAA that have played at least 1,500 minutes.

Note: GP = Games played; Mins = Minutes played; W = Wins; L = Losses; OTL = Overtime losses; SOL = Shootout losses; SO = Shutouts; GAA = Goals against average; Sv% = Save percentage

2022 WHL Playoffs

Conference Quarter-finals

Eastern Conference

(E1) Winnipeg Ice vs. (E8) Prince Albert Raiders

(E2) Edmonton Oil Kings vs. (E7) Lethbridge Hurricanes

(E3) Red Deer Rebels vs. (E6) Brandon Wheat Kings

(E4) Moose Jaw Warriors vs. (E5) Saskatoon Blades

Western Conference

(W1) Everett Silvertips vs. (W8) Vancouver Giants

(W2) Kamloops Blazers vs. (W7) Spokane Chiefs

(W3) Portland Winterhawks vs. (W6) Prince George Cougars

(W4) Seattle Thunderbirds vs. (W5) Kelowna Rockets

Conference Semi-finals

Eastern Conference

(E1) Winnipeg Ice vs. (E4) Moose Jaw Warriors

(E2) Edmonton Oil Kings vs. (E3) Red Deer Rebels

Western Conference

(W2) Kamloops Blazers vs. (W8) Vancouver Giants

(W3) Portland Winterhawks vs. (W4) Seattle Thunderbirds

Conference Finals

Eastern Conference

(E1) Winnipeg Ice vs. (E2) Edmonton Oil Kings

Western Conference

(W2) Kamloops Blazers vs. (W4) Seattle Thunderbirds

WHL Championship

(E2) Edmonton Oil Kings vs. (W4) Seattle Thunderbirds

Playoff scoring leaders
Note: GP = Games played; G = Goals; A = Assists; Pts = Points; PIM = Penalty minutes

Playoff leading goaltenders
Note: GP = Games played; Mins = Minutes played; W = Wins; L = Losses; GA = Goals Allowed; SO = Shutouts; SV& = Save percentage; GAA = Goals against average

WHL awards

All-Star Teams

Eastern Conference

Central Division

East Division

Western Conference

B.C. Division

U.S. Division

See also 
 List of WHL seasons
 2022 Memorial Cup
 2021–22 OHL season
 2021–22 QMJHL season

References

External links 

 Official website of the Western Hockey League
 Official website of the Canadian Hockey League

Western Hockey League seasons
Whl
WHL